The Richard Glazebrook Medal and Prize is awarded annually by the Institute of Physics to recognise leadership in the field of physics. It was established in 1966 and named in honour of Sir Richard T. Glazebrook, the first president of the Institute of Physics. It was originally a silver medal with a £250 prize.

The award consists of the medal, a cash prize and a certificate. In 1992, the Institute decided that the medal and prize should become one of its Premier Awards and that, from 2008, it should be one of its Gold medals.

Recipients
The following have received the award:

See also
 Institute of Physics Awards
 List of physics awards
 List of awards named after people

References

1966 establishments in the United Kingdom
Awards established in 1966
Awards of the Institute of Physics